José García de León y Pizarro (1770 in Madrid – 1835 in Madrid) was Minister of State (First Secretary of State) of Spain from 30 October 1816 to 14 September 1818.  He married Maria Mercedes Avila and had a son Rafael Garcia.

Spanish untitled nobility
1770 births
1835 deaths
Government ministers of Spain